David Woodhouse is an American architect born in Peoria, Illinois. He is the founder of David Woodhouse Architects, now Woodhouse Tinucci Architects.

Biography and influences
Woodhouse received his Bachelor of Architecture from the University of Illinois at Urbana in 1971 in a program that included study at the École des Beaux-Arts in Versailles, France.  He then joined Stanley Tigerman and Associates in Chicago, where he became an associate before leaving in 1978 to join Booth/Hansen and Associates, where he was senior associate and vice president.  In 1987 he started a partnership which became David Woodhouse Architects in 1990.  He gained membership in the College of Fellows of the American Institute of Architects in 1999. In 2014, after a 13-year collaboration with Andy Tinucci changed the David Woodhouse Architects LLC (DWA) firm name to Woodhouse Tinucci Architects.

Awards
His projects have won preservation citations from the Richard H Driehaus Foundation, Landmarks Illinois, and the Lake Forest Preservation Foundation. They have been published both here and abroad in architectural periodicals and books such as Architectural Record, the Chicago Tribune and the AIA Guide to Chicago.

Projects

Daniel Burnham Memorial Competition (Chicago)
University of Chicago Booth School of Business Gleacher Center Annex
University of Chicago Bond Chapel
Northwestern University Sailing Center
the Lake Forest LibraryChildren's Theater
Buckingham Fountain Visitor Pavilions
Venues for Chicago's Bid for the 2016 Olympics
the Rainbow Park Beach Houses and Field House
the Divine Word Chapel in Techny, Illinois
Lake County Museum in Wauconda, Illinois
the buildings at Independence Grove Forest Preserve in Libertyville
the East and West Gates at Lincoln Park Zoo
the Davis Square Park Pool House and Field House renovation
the Morton Arboretum Visitor Center
Lincoln Park Conservatory Master Plan
DuSable Harbor Building on Chicago’s lakefront
the Cove School in Northbrook, Illinois
the Main Library renovation at Northwestern University
the Alice Kaplan Institute for the Humanities at Northwestern University
the Daley Library Information Commons at the University of Illinois at Chicago

Exhibitions and publications
Woodhouse's proposal for Chicago's Education District is featured in the book Visionary Chicago Architecture, edited by Stanley Tigerman in 2004.

Juries and teaching
Woodhouse has served on architectural design award juries for the American Institute of Architects and preservation foundations, has contributed articles to several architectural periodicals and has been a faculty member at Archeworks.
  
He has taught as an adjunct professor at the Illinois Institute of Technology's College of Architecture and is a frequent lecturer and visiting design critic at the University of Illinois in Chicago, the Illinois Institute of Technology and the School of the Art Institute of Chicago.

Notes

External links

David Woodhouse Architects
 Burnham Design Competition Entires

Living people
Year of birth missing (living people)
Architects from Chicago
Artists from Peoria, Illinois